Ahn Shi-hyun, or Shi Hyun Ahn (15 September 1984) is a South Korean professional golfer.

Pro golf career
Ahn turned professional in 2002 and that year she topped the order of merit on the Apache Dream Tour (the KLPGA's developmental tour) after winning three times. In 2003, she won the CJ Nine Bridges Classic, an LPGA Tour sanctioned event in her home country. At 19 years, 1 month and 18 days she was the youngest non-American winner in the tour's history. She also finished fourth on the LPGA of Korea Tour money list. In 2004, she was the Rookie of the Year on the U.S. based LPGA Tour, after finishing in sole second place in the LPGA Championship, which is one of the four LPGA majors and finishing sixteenth on the money list. She also won the MBC-Xcanvas Open on the LPGA of Korea Tour that year. In 2005, she finished 36th on the LPGA Tour money list.

During her second round of play at the 2009 LPGA Championship, Ahn struck and killed a robin with her tee shot on the 9th hole.

While playing in the 2010 CN Canadian Women's Open, Ahn and fellow South Korean golfer Il Mi Chung were accused of taking part in a rules violation cover-up after they each accidentally hit the other's golf ball on the 18th hole during the first round of play. Chung and Ahn were disqualified after the round. The LPGA launched an investigation into what took place. A tour official said "One thing that is clear is that both players called the penalty on themselves and as a result, both players were disqualified. They admitted their mistake and accepted the penalty, so the Rules of Golf were adhered to."

Personal life
Ahn was born in Incheon, and attended  there. She married actor Marcos Lee in 2011. They have one daughter, Grace (born 2012), but divorced in 2013.

Professional wins (3)

LPGA Tour wins (1)

KLPGA wins (3)
2003 CJ Nine Bridges Classic
2004 MBC-Xcanvas Open
2016 Kia Motors Korea Women's Open Championship

Results in LPGA majors
Results not in chronological order before 2019.

^ The Evian Championship was added as a major in 2013

CUT = missed the half-way cut
"T" = tied

Summary

Most consecutive cuts made – 8 (2005 British Open – 2007 U.S. Open)
Longest streak of top-10s – 3 (2006 Kraft Nabisco Championship – 2006 U.S. Open)

Team appearances
Amateur
Espirito Santo Trophy (representing South Korea): 2000

Professional
Lexus Cup (representing Asia team): 2006 (winners), 2007 (winners)

References

External links 

Seoul Sisters – fansite profile

South Korean female golfers
LPGA Tour golfers
LPGA of Korea Tour golfers
Golfers from Seoul
South Korean Buddhists
1984 births
Living people